Decatur is a city in East Tennessee. In reference to places in Tennessee, "Decatur" may also refer to:

Decatur County, Tennessee
Decaturville, Tennessee